Damian Ball (born ) is a British rugby league coach and former footballer.

Ball was the captain at Halifax from 2006. He usually played at loose forward, but could also operate at second row. He signed for Halifax after a six-month sabbatical from the game. His previous clubs were Dewsbury Rams, Hull Kingston Rovers, Rochdale Hornets and York City Knights.

As well as his part-time involvement in Halifax, he has also held teaching posts at the North Halifax Grammar School, Halifax and The Brooksbank School, Elland, West Yorkshire, England.

Damian was also named 2008 assistant coach under new boss Matt Calland.

References

1970s births
Living people
Dewsbury Rams players
English rugby league players
Halifax R.L.F.C. captains
Halifax R.L.F.C. players
Hull Kingston Rovers players
Rochdale Hornets players
Rugby league locks
Schoolteachers from Yorkshire
York City Knights players
York Wasps players